The Jewish Post is a set of Jewish publications with several U.S. state editions including Indiana, Kentucky, Chicago, Missouri and New York.

Founder
The publication was created by long-time owner and editor Gabriel Murrel Cohen (1908-2007). Born in Louisville, Kentucky, after graduating from University of North Carolina at Chapel Hill in 1930, he returned to Louisville, Kentucky to start The Jewish Post at age 22 on March 10, 1930. He moved the editorial offices to Indianapolis in 1933. He continued printing an edition in Kentucky into the 1940s as well carrying ads for businesses in Kentucky.

Spinoffs
Later on the Indiana publication became known as The National Jewish Post starting August 2, 1944. It has the slogan "A Journal for Indiana Jewry".

The Jewish Post and Opinion is a monthly English Jewish publication, published in Indianapolis, Indiana. It is a continuation of The Jewish Post founded and funded by Gabriel Murrel Cohen, it is managed by Jennie Cohen, his daughter.

The Missouri Jewish Post edition ran from 1948 to 1992 before stopping publication.

The Jewish Post of New York traces its origins as an independent publication from 1974 to 1983 when the New York City edition became a separate publication from The Jewish Post and Opinion. It had a circulation of 21,000.

References

External links
The Jewish Post of New York website
The Jewish Post and Opinion, Indiana website
The Jewish Post and Opinion, search and browse the newspaper archive

Jewish newspapers published in the United States